Carl Walther Strom (December 22, 1899 – January 27, 1969) was an American diplomat who served as United States ambassador to Cambodia, replacing Robert M. McClintock, from October 11, 1956 to March 8, 1959 and United States ambassador to Bolivia from April 8, 1959 to May 8, 1961.

Biography
He graduated from Luther College (Iowa) in 1919 and earned a PhD in mathematics from the University of Illinois.

Diplomatic career
Strom was named United States ambassador to Cambodia on October 11, 1956. Strom served until March 8, 1959. On April 8, 1959 he was named United States ambassador to Bolivia. He served until May 8, 1961.

References

1899 births
1969 deaths
Ambassadors of the United States to Bolivia
Ambassadors of the United States to Cambodia
Luther College (Iowa) alumni
University of Illinois alumni